Obolopteryx is a North American genus of katydids or bush crickets in the subfamily Phaneropterinae and tribe Odonturini.

Species 
The Orthoptera Species File lists:
 Obolopteryx brevihastata (Morse, 1902)
 Obolopteryx castanea (Rehn & Hebard, 1914)
 Obolopteryx catinata (Rehn & Hebard, 1914)
 Obolopteryx emarginata (Brunner von Wattenwyl, 1878)type species (as Dichopetala emarginata)
 Obolopteryx eurycerca Barrientos-Lozano & Rocha-Sánchez, 2016
 Obolopteryx gladiator (Rehn & Hebard, 1914)
 Obolopteryx huastecana Barrientos-Lozano & Rocha-Sánchez, 2016
 Obolopteryx nigra Barrientos-Lozano & Rocha-Sánchez, 2016
 Obolopteryx oreoeca (Rehn & Hebard, 1914)
 Obolopteryx poecila (Hebard, 1932)
 Obolopteryx seeversi (Strohecker, 1941)
 Obolopteryx tamaholipana Barrientos-Lozano & Rocha-Sánchez, 2016
 Obolopteryx tanchipae Barrientos-Lozano & Rocha-Sánchez, 2016
 Obolopteryx truncoangulata Barrientos-Lozano & Rocha-Sánchez, 2015

References

External links 
 
 

Tettigoniidae genera
Phaneropterinae
Orthoptera of North America